Penicillium amagasakiense is an anamorph fungus species of the genus of Penicillium. The Glucose oxidase of Penicillium amagasakiense has been studied in detail because of the use of Glucose oxidase in biosensors and fermentation fluids.

See also
List of Penicillium species

Further reading

References 

amagasakiense
Fungi described in 1960